Anand is an Indian actor known for his works predominantly in Tamil, Malayalam and Telugu films along with a few Kannada productions. He has also acted in several Malayalam TV serials.

The actor's biggest film till date is Mani Ratnam's black comedy film Thiruda Thiruda, but unlike his co-stars of that film, it failed to give him a breakthrough. He has also played second lead roles and supporting characters in several films including Kamal Haasan's Sathya and Vijayakanth's Poonthotta Kaavalkaaran.

Career
He made his film debut in 1987 with Vanna Kanavugal. He is best known for his works in films such as Sathya (1988), Anbe En Anbe (1988), Apoorva Sagodharargal (1989), Oor Mariyadhai (1992),  Thalaivasal (1992), Thiruda Thiruda (1993), screened at the Toronto International Film Festival, and Enakku 20 Unakku 18 (2003).

Anand also produced and directed a Malayalam short film "Kassu Panam Thuttu Money Money". His recent works as a character actor include hits such as 1: Nenokkadine (2014), Ring Master (2014), Ivan Maryadaraman (2015),  Srimanthudu (2015), and  Gentleman (2016).

Early and personal life

Anand was born in Hyderabad as the youngest of four sons. His father V. S. Bharathi, worked for Brooke Bond India Ltd, and his mother Rajalakshmi is a house wife. His brothers are B. Ramesh, a Vice President of Finance with Times of India, Dr. B. Suresh, a teacher at English Vivekananda College, and Bharat Arun, a former Indian cricketer and now bowling coach for Indian cricket team. Anand also owns a restaurant named Zenzerro in Thiruvananthapuram.
 

Anand is married to actress Poornima since 2009.

Legal issues 
In 2000, the actor was involved in drunk driving hit and run case, where he hit a police officer who had tried to stop him. The police officer, Ramachandran, subsequently succumbed to his injuries and the actor faced a murder charge. The actor made a financial settlement with the victim's family. Later he was acquitted, and was found innocent.

His house in Uthandi, Chennai was burgled in 2008 and the actor cited that it was an "inside job".

Filmography

Television

References

External links
 

Indian male film actors
Male actors in Kannada cinema
Male actors in Malayalam cinema
Indian male television actors
Male actors in Telugu cinema
Male actors in Tamil cinema
Living people
Tamil male actors
Male actors in Malayalam television
20th-century Indian male actors
21st-century Indian male actors
Male actors from Chennai
1968 births